Debra "Debbie" Dean is a fictional character from the British Channel 4 soap opera Hollyoaks, played by Jodi Albert. She first appeared in 2002, before Albert quit the role in 2004. She made her final appearance during 2005, before making a brief return in 2006.

Casting
In October 2004 Albert decided not to renew her contract, she expressed that she wanted to leave to further her acting career. In September 2006 it was announced that Albert would make a brief return to the show in November 2006.

Storylines
Debbie arrived in 2002 with her father Johnno (Mark Powley), mother Frankie (Helen Pearson), brothers Jake (Kevin Sacre) and Craig (Guy Burnett), and sister Steph (Carley Stenson). She instantly fell for the charms of hard man Dan Hunter. The second child and first daughter of the Dean Family, Debbie started dating Dan as she often tried to loosen him up. Debbie started to work for Tony at ‘Il Gnosh’, but her heart had always been set on becoming a singer.

Debbie went on a reality show where she revealed that Dan lost his virginity to her. This left Dan angry, but eventually, he forgave her. However, there was shock for Debbie when Dan was arrested for being a suspect as the serial killer of Hollyoaks, and she was also shocked that he slept with victim Roxy. Both convinced that Dan was innocent, Debbie and her father Johnno (Colin Wells) stuck by him and supported him as he was released.

However, things took another turning point for Debbie when Dan was arrested for the murder of Toby Mills (Henry Luxemburg), who was the real killer and again became a suspect after Dan's sister Ellie Hunter (Sarah Baxendale) blamed him for the murder of her husband. This left Debbie devastated as she tried to come terms with Dan's arrest, while there was more bad news for Debbie as her family were struggling with debts and sister Steph had epilepsy, after almost becoming a victim of Toby.

Johnno supported Debbie and the family through this as best he could, and in return Debbie showed her loyalty to both her family and Dan, but was devastated when Dan was sent down for 18 years after Ellie testified against him. Still, Debbie believed there was hope as she tried to change Ellie's mind but there was a blow for her, when Dan told her that their relationship was over. Confused and puzzled, Debbie turned to Darren Osborne (Ashley Taylor Dawson) and the pair slept together, but it only lasted a short while.

However, Debbie faced another shock when Ellie told the truth and Dan was released from prison. Dan wanted to be with Debbie, but after she confessed that she slept with Darren, Dan said that there would be no relationship between the pair. With help from Johnno, Debbie tried to put all of this behind her, however, things became even more complex when Dan started dating Debbie's sister Steph for a while, but that lasted a short time after Dan admitted that he was still in love with Debbie. However, Debbie promised Steph that she would not date Dan as it would break Steph's heart.

Soon, Debbie's dream became true when she got a job offer to sing on a cruise ship in November 2004. But after her parents Johnno and Frankie's marriage collapsed, and Johnno decided to leave Hollyoaks when the couple divorced shortly afterwards, Debbie was unsure of whether to go or not. With Frankie, Jake, and Dan supporting her, Debbie decided to take the job but there was another setback when Dan died during his rallycross racing accident.

After Dan's death, Debbie collapsed in tears as she found an engagement ring Dan had been planning to give to her on Christmas Day. By New Year's Eve, Debbie had decided not to wallow in grief and misery but to see more of the world and enjoy her life to the fullest — or as much as she could without Dan by her side. Debbie stayed until the funeral and regretted that she and Dan never got together.

After some convincing from Dan's best mate Ben Davies (Marcus Patric), Debbie decided to take the job and start a fresh new life and to succeed with her dreams. Debbie briefly returned in 2005 for a double wedding in the family. She witnessed her mother Frankie marry Jack Osborne (James McKenna) and her brother Jake marry Becca Hayton (Ali Bastian).

She also returned in 2006 to re-open The Dog after Sam Owen (Louis Tamone) blew it up. She also had a job in the West End but lost her job when Steph became famous for her kiss and tell with Joe Jones.

Post departure

In April 2007, Jake told his mother that Debbie had been in a car accident and while she was not seriously hurt, she had broken her leg. In September 2007, Steph visited Debbie. In October 2008, Steph and Tom Cunningham (Ellis Hollins) went to stay with Debbie for several weeks and Debbie hit it off with Tom, after also visiting their father Johnno. In November 2010, Debbie, along with Craig and Jake and father Johnno were devastated of Steph's death, and did not attend the funeral. In December 2010, Frankie mentions to Duncan Button (Dean Aspen) that she and the other Deans and Osbournes are spending Christmas with Debbie. In 2015, Frankie stayed with Debbie for a number of months. Following Frankie's death from a stroke in October 2017, Debbie does not attend the funeral.

Reception
Virgin Media profiled some of Hollyoaks' "hottest females" in their opinion, of Debbie they stated: "The sassy Debbie Dean did her bit for Hollyoaks' male viewing ratings as she regularly tottered round in the skimpiest of outfits. She left, heartbroken after Dan's death, to sing on a cruise ship – lucky sailors!"

References

External links
 Character profile at Hollyoaks.com

Dean, Debbie
Dean, Debbie
Dean, Debbie
Dean, Debbie